Henry Edward Doyle CB (1827 – 17 February 1893) was an Irish painter and draughtsman, and for 23 years the director of the National Gallery of Ireland.

Life
Doyle was the third son of John Doyle (author of the "H. B." political sketches) and Marianne, daughter of Mr. James Conan, of Dublin. He was born in 1827, and educated as an artist. On the recommendation of Cardinal Wiseman, he was appointed Commissioner for Rome at the 1862 International Exhibition in London, and for his services in that capacity was nominated a Knight of the Order of Pius IX.

He was Art Superintendent of the International Exhibition of 1865, in Dublin; and honorary secretary of the National Portrait Gallery in connection with that of 1872. in the same city.  He was elected by the Board of Governors Director of the National Gallery of Ireland, in 1869 on the death of George Francis Mulvany, R.H.A., the first holder of that office. He was also a member of the Committee of Advice for the three special exhibitions of national portraits from 1866 to 1868, and he was a member of the Royal Hibernian Academy.

During his twenty-three years' incumbency of the directorship of the Irish National Gallery, he raised that collection from insignificance to a more than respectable place among the minor galleries of Europe, and that in spite of extreme parsimony on the part of the treasury.

In 1880 he was nominated a Companion of the Order of the Bath. He died suddenly on 17 February 1892.

Family
On 6 February 1866 he married Jane Isabella Ball, daughter of the Right Hon. Nicholas Ball, one of the Judges of the Court of Common Pleas (Ireland) and Jane Sherlock, and the sister of John Ball at St. James' Church, Spanish-place, London. The ceremony was performed by Jane's brother, the Rev. Anthony Ball. His nephew was the author Sir Arthur Conan Doyle.

References

Attribution

1827 births
1893 deaths
19th-century Irish painters
Irish male painters
Companions of the Order of the Bath
Draughtsmen
Knights of the Order of Pope Pius IX
Henry Edward
Museum people from Dublin (city)